KF Vëllazëria is a professional football club from Kosovo which competes in the Second League. The club is based in Zhur. Their home ground is the Zhur Stadium which has a seating capacity of 2,500.

See also
 List of football clubs in Kosovo

References

Football clubs in Kosovo
Association football clubs established in 1968